John Korvola was one of four Finnish homesteaders who came to Roseberry in Valley County, Idaho after the Spanish–American War. The town flourished until it failed to get the railroad, which passed 1.5 miles to the west, instead.

The homestead was listed on the National Register of Historic Places in 1982. It was one of 13 buildings in the Long Valley area that were considered together for NRHP listing in 1982; all were built by Finns using traditional Finnish log construction.

References 

Finnish-American culture in Idaho
Farms on the National Register of Historic Places in Idaho
Buildings and structures completed in 1900
Buildings and structures in Valley County, Idaho
National Register of Historic Places in Valley County, Idaho
1900 establishments in Idaho